Olivier Delaître and Guy Forget were the defending champions, but they did not participate together this year.  Delaître partnered David Prinosil, losing in the semifinals.  Forget partnered Jakob Hlasek, losing in the quarterfinals.

Jacco Eltingh and Paul Haarhuis won the title, defeating Yevgeny Kafelnikov and Andrei Olhovskiy 6–2, 3–6, 6–3 in the final.

Seeds

  Jacco Eltingh /  Paul Haarhuis (champions)
  Yevgeny Kafelnikov /  Andrei Olhovskiy (final)
  Cyril Suk /  Daniel Vacek (quarterfinals)
  Trevor Kronemann /  Davic Macpherson (first round)

Draw

Draw

External links
Draw

1995 Gerry Weber Open